André Luiz Paulino de Souza Motta (born 14 March 1985, in Rio de Janeiro), known as André Paulino, is a Brazilian footballer who plays for Madureira. Mainly a defensive midfielder, he can also play as a central defender.

Club career
André Paulino was loaned to Avaí in September 2007 and loaned to CFZ in August 2008.

He only played once in 2011 Brazilian fourth division with Itumbiara, in September.

References

External links
CBF profile 

André Paulino at ZeroZero

1985 births
Living people
Footballers from Rio de Janeiro (city)
Brazilian footballers
Association football defenders
Association football midfielders
Association football utility players
Campeonato Brasileiro Série A players
Campeonato Brasileiro Série B players
Campeonato Brasileiro Série C players
Madureira Esporte Clube players
Avaí FC players
Centro de Futebol Zico players
Volta Redonda FC players
Nova Iguaçu Futebol Clube players
Santa Cruz Futebol Clube players
Associação Desportiva Cabofriense players
Anápolis Futebol Clube players
Itumbiara Esporte Clube players
Esporte Clube Novo Hamburgo players
Associação Chapecoense de Futebol players
Botafogo Futebol Clube (PB) players
Ceará Sporting Club players
Macaé Esporte Futebol Clube players